Zryanin is a rural locality (a khutor) in Lysovskoye Rural Settlement, Surovikinsky District, Volgograd Oblast, Russia. The population was 27 as of 2010.

Geography 
Zryanin is located near the Liska River, 33 km northeast of Surovikino (the district's administrative centre) by road. Lysov is the nearest rural locality.

References 

Rural localities in Surovikinsky District